Chiara Cassin (born 13 January 1978) is an Italian former synchronized swimmer who competed in the 2000 Summer Olympics.

References

1973 births
Living people
Italian synchronized swimmers
Olympic synchronized swimmers of Italy
Synchronized swimmers at the 2000 Summer Olympics
People from Mestre-Carpenedo
Sportspeople from Venice